Chronologic is the fourth studio album by French electro swing group Caravan Palace, released on August 30, 2019.

Track listing

Personnel
Zoé Colotis - vocalist
Charles Delaporte - double bass
Hugues Payen - violin
Antoine Toustou - trombone
Arnaud Vial - guitar

Charts

References

2019 albums
Caravan Palace albums
Electro swing albums